The 1985–86 Biathlon World Cup was a multi-race tournament over a season of biathlon, organised by the UIPMB (Union Internationale de Pentathlon Moderne et Biathlon). The season started on 16 January 1986 in Antholz-Anterselva, Italy, and ended on 16 March 1986 in Boden, Sweden. It was the ninth season of the Biathlon World Cup.

Calendar
Below is the World Cup calendar for the 1985–86 season.

 1986 World Championship races were not included in the 1985–86 World Cup scoring system.

*The relays were technically unofficial races as they did not count towards anything in the World Cup.

World Cup Podium

Men

Standings: Men

Overall 

 Final standings after 10 races.

Achievements
First World Cup career victory
 , 21, in his 1st season — the WC 1 Individual in Antholz-Anterselva; it also was his first podium
 , in his 3rd season — the WC 2 Sprint in Feistritz; first podium was 1985–86 Sprint in Antholz-Anterselva
 , 21, in his 3rd season — the WC 4 Sprint in Lahti; first podium was 1984–85 Sprint in Lahti
 , 28, in his 7th season — the WC 5 Individual in Boden; first podium was 1981–82 Sprint in Ruhpolding

First World Cup podium
 , 24, in his 5th season — no. 2 in the WC 1 Individual in Antholz-Anterselva
 , in his 3rd season — no. 2 in the WC 1 Sprint in Antholz-Anterselva
 , 22, in his 3rd season — no. 3 in the WC 1 Sprint in Antholz-Anterselva
 , 23, in his 1st season — no. 3 in the WC 3 Individual in Oberhof
 , 24, in his 3rd season — no. 2 in the WC 4 Individual in Lahti
 , 24, in his 5th season — no. 3 in the WC 4 Individual in Lahti
 , 20, in his 2nd season — no. 3 in the WC 4 Sprint in Lahti

Victory in this World Cup (all-time number of victories in parentheses)
 , 3 (9) first places
 , 2 (4) first places
 , 1 (2) first place
 , 1 (1) first place
 , 1 (1) first place
 , 1 (1) first place
 , 1 (1) first place

Retirements
Following notable biathletes retired after the 1985–86 season:

References

Biathlon World Cup
World Cup